Scott Joplin is a 1977 biographical film directed by Jeremy Kagan and based on the life of African-American composer and pianist Scott Joplin. It stars Billy Dee Williams and Clifton Davis. Its script won an award from the Writers Guild of America in 1979. The only other composers mentioned as worthy equals in the film are John Philip Sousa and Jelly Roll Morton. Eubie Blake makes an appearance in the movie.

Plot
In the late 19th century, Scott Joplin, a young African-American musician, moves to Missouri and to make ends meet finds a job as a piano teacher. He befriends Louis Chauvin, who plays the piano in a brothel.

Joplin composes ragtime music. One day his "Maple Leaf Rag" is heard by John Stark, a publisher of sheet music in St. Louis, Missouri. Stark is impressed, buys the rights to the composition and sells it, with Joplin sharing some of the profits. Joplin's new songs also achieve a great popularity.

Chauvin is equally talented, but contracts syphilis and dies in his 20s. Joplin becomes obsessed with composing more serious music, yet is continually thwarted in his attempt to write and publish an opera.

Cast
 Billy Dee Williams as Scott Joplin
 Clifton Davis as Louis Chauvin
 Margaret Avery as Belle Joplin
 Eubie Blake as Will Williams, the judge of the piano cutting contest on August 18, 1899
 Godfrey Cambridge as Tom Turpin
 Art Carney as John Stark
 Seymour Casselas Dr. Jaelki
 DeWayne Jessie as John The Baptist
 Taj Mahal as Poor Alfred
 Sam Theard as One-handed guy
 Mabel King as Madam Amy
 David Healy as Sam Bundler
 Samuel Fuller as Impresario
 Leon Charles as Liebling
 Fred Pinkard as Dr. Adams
 Delos V. Smith Jr. as Wallis
 Marcus Grapes as Rabin
 Denise Gordy as The Girl
 David Hubbard as Young Scott

Production
The film was made as a TV movie that was to air on NBC as Motown Productions' first venture into dramatic television. However, the film was given a theatrical release instead after Universal Pictures executives thought it had box-office potential.

Reception
After the film tested poorly in Phoenix, Arizona, but strongly in Washington, D.C., it was marketed primarily to black audiences.

A review in Variety stated, "Williams is fine, and the film has a lot of verve and intensity, but the story of Joplin's life is so grim it makes the film a real downer. Another problem is that the Motown Production was originally intended for TV, and shows it in the choppy episodic structure and corner-cutting production values."

Gene Siskel of the Chicago Tribune awarded 2 stars out of 4 and called it "a turgid film" consisting of "two Joplin successes and a whole mess of failures. Both successes come in the film's first 30 minutes ... From then on the film is a downer."

Hollie J. West of The Washington Post wrote, "The film was originally intended for television, and may wind up there yet. Lingering close-ups are plentiful, and the dramatic content fleshless and simplistic. As Joplin, Billy Dee Williams is believable. But he is ensnared in a screenplay which presents the greatest ragtime composer on only two levels: driven by a desire to become an accepted composer, and tormented by a crippling case of syphilis."

References

External links
 
 

1977 films
1970s American films
1970s English-language films
African-American musical films
Films about composers
Films about pianos and pianists
Films directed by Jeremy Kagan
Motown Productions films
NBC network original films
Ragtime films
Scott Joplin